The 1983–84 Miami Redskins men's basketball team represent Miami University in the 1983–84 NCAA Division I men's basketball season. The Redskins, led by 1st-year head coach Jerry Peirson, played their home games at Millett Hall in Oxford, Ohio as members of the Mid-American Conference. The team finished second in the conference regular season standings, and followed by reaching the championship game of the MAC tournament to earn an at-large bid to the NCAA tournament. As the No. 12 seed in the Southeast region, Miami was beaten by the No. 5 seed Maryland Terrapins, a team that featured standout Len Bias, in the opening round, 69–68 in OT.

Junior Ron Harper was named MAC Player of the Year, and established school records for points in a game (45), season (772; surpassed by Wally Szczerbiak in 1998–99), and career (1,620). Harper also set school records for steals in a game (7; surpassed by Darrian Ringo in 2017–18), season (82; surpassed by Harper the following season), and career (176). By the time his career ended, Harper would extend his career records in points and steals, and finished as Miami's career leader in rebounds as well.

Roster

Schedule and results

|-
!colspan=9 style=| Non-conference regular season

|-
!colspan=9 style=| MAC regular season

|-
!colspan=9 style=| MAC tournament

|-
!colspan=9 style=| NCAA tournament

Source

Awards and honors
Ron Harper – MAC Player of the Year

References

Miami RedHawks men's basketball seasons
Miami (OH)
Miami (OH)